Mudzi West is a constituency of the National Assembly of the Parliament of Zimbabwe, located in Mudzi District, Mashonaland East Province. Its current MP since the 2018 election is Magna Mudyiwa of ZANU–PF.

Profile 
Mudzi West is located in Mudzi District in Mashonaland East Province, and comprises the Shanga, Suswe, Mudzi, Musarakufa and Chiunye areas. It is a rural area.

Electoral history
In 2000 Ray J.Kaukonde of the ZANU PF party won with 92% of the vote.

In the 2005 election, Aqualina Katsande, the ZANU PF candidate won with 83.6% of the vote. More than 11,000 votes at the 2005 general election were not accounted for.

In the 2008 elections, Aqualinah Katsande (ZANU PF) was challenged by three other candidates, one each from the United People's Party (UPP), the Movement for Democratic Change – Tsvangirai (MDC-T) and the Movement for Democratic Change – Ncube (MDC). Katsande retained her seat in the Assembly with 9,417 votes or 72.8% of the vote. Katsande and her son were accused of voter intimidation.

In the 2013 elections, voters continued to face intimidation from ZANU-PF stalwarts. Again the ZANU-PF candidate, Aqualinah Katsande, won, with the official count for her being 14,266 votes or 93.4% of the vote.

References

Mashonaland East Province
Parliamentary constituencies in Zimbabwe